Burg Neuberg (German Schloss Neuberg oder Neuburg) is a castle in Styria, Austria.

See also
List of castles in Austria

References

Castles in Styria